Pashayi or Pashai (پشه اې ژبه) is a group of Indo-Aryan languages spoken by the Pashai people in parts of Kapisa, Laghman, Nangarhar, Nuristan, Kunar and Kabul (Surobi District) provinces in Northeastern Afghanistan. 

The Pashayi languages had no written form prior to 2003. There are four mutually unintelligible varieties, with only about a 30% lexical similarity:

 Northeastern: Aret, Chalas (Chilas), Kandak, Korangal, Kurdar dialects
 Northwestern: Alasai, Bolaghain, Gulbahar, Kohnadeh, Laurowan, Najil, Nangarach, Pachagan, Pandau, Parazhghan, Pashagar, Sanjan, Shamakot, Shutul, Uzbin, Wadau dialects
 Southeastern: Damench, Laghmani, Sum, Upper and Lower Darai Nur, Wegali dialects
 Southwestern: Ishpi, Isken, Tagau dialects

A grammar of the language was written as a doctoral dissertation in 2014.

Phonology

Consonants 

 [h] is only phonemic in the Amla dialect.
 Sounds [f] and [q] can also occur, but only in loanwords and among Dari speakers.
 [ʂ] is more commonly heard among older speakers, but is lost among younger speakers, and is heard as a postalveolar [ʃ].
 [ʐ] is more commonly heard among older speakers, but is lost among younger speakers, and is heard as a postalveolar [ʒ].
 /ʋ/ is heard before front vowels /i e/. When occurring before or after central or back vowels /a u o/, it is heard as [w].
 According to Masica (1991) some dialects have a //.

Vowels 

 Only mid or low vowels have lengthened equivalents.
 /e/ can be heard as [ɛ] and /a/ can be heard as [ə] or [æ], in certain environments.

Further reading

References 

Dardic languages
Languages of Afghanistan